Reotith High School is a public school located in the Dighwa Dubauli area of Bihar.

High schools and secondary schools in Bihar
Educational institutions in India with year of establishment missing